is a supernatural fiction literary series about the exploits of a group of feng shui experts and their conflicts with various spiritual disturbances across Japan. Volume 4.0 of the series has been adapted into a live action film and a video game for the PlayStation. The series is a spin off of Hiroshi Aramata's Teito Monogatari series.

Characters
 Tatsuto Kuroda: the grandson of Shigemaru Kuroda, a feng shui practitioner.
 Mizuchi Ariyoshi: a female psychic who helps Kuroda.
 Otsu: Mizuchi's animal companion, a black cat.

Volumes in the Main Series
Version 1.0: ワタシnoイエ
Version 2.0: 二色人（ニイルピト）の夜
Version 3.0: 新宿チャンスン
Version 4.0: 闇吹く夏
Version 5.0: 絶の島事件

Tokyo Dragon

In 1997, Version 4.0 of the series was adapted into a made for TV film entitled Tokyo Dragon (東京龍) produced and released by Ace Pictures.

Video Game
Volume 4.0 (闇吹く夏) of the series was also adapted into an Action-adventure game for the PlayStation released in 1999.

References

External links
Amazon.co.jp entry on VERSION 1.0 (Volume 1) of the series
Japanese Horror Movie Database entry on Tokyo Dragon
English language review of the Tokyo Dragon movie
Review and information about the PS1 game
Youtube Link: Opening Cinematic of PS1 Video Game

1990s fantasy novels
Fantasy books by series
Japanese fantasy novels
Japanese horror novels
Japanese novels adapted into films
Sequel novels

1999 video games
PlayStation (console) games
Video games developed in Japan

Films based on Japanese novels
Japanese fantasy films
Japanese horror films
1990s Japanese-language films
Tokusatsu films
Japanese supernatural horror films
Japanese dark fantasy films
1990s Japanese films